Cleanova are a set of plug-in hybrid vehicles by the Société de Véhicules Electriques (SVE), a joint venture between Dassault, Heuliez and Hydro-Québec. Cleanova II is based on Renault Kangoo. In January 2010, SVE has been taken over by Dow Kokam (USA Dow Chemical and US-Korean Townsend Kokam). In 2009 Dow Kokam received a $161 Million U.S. Department of Energy Grant for Next-Generation Battery Production for the hybrid and electric vehicle markets. The Michigan-based facility - Townsend Kokam Advanced Battery -is expected to produce enough batteries to supply 60,000 hybrid or electric vehicles per year. Three battery technologies are currently used in the cleanova: Li-Mn2O4, Li-FePO4, and Li-NiCoAl, with storage capacity adjustable to customer needs (16 to 30 kWh). Half the battery capacity can for instance be restored within 30 minutes.

Speeds of up to 130 km/h in electric mode.

The French postal services company "la Poste" ordered some 500 Kangoo Cleanova's.

Full Electric Vehicle 
In this version, the battery charges exclusively from the mains.

Plug-in Hybrid Electric Vehicle 
Plug-in hybrid with three modes:

 All-electric
 Series
 Parallel

The driver can switch manually between the three modes.

The powertrain can then deliver up to 100 kW.

Velib 
There are plans to integrate payment for the bike and car hire schemes with the ticketing systems for traditional modes of public transport. Two electric vehicle manufacturers are said to be in the frame to supply the cars: the  Dassault Group and Bolloré. The former has a vehicle called the Cleanova, which  employs the body of the Renault Kangoo van, while Bolloré's Bluecar has been developed with Italian styling house Pininfarina and is due to go on sale commercially next year.

See also 
 Velib

References 

Dassault Group
Battery electric vehicles
Plug-in hybrid vehicles